The Lewis and Clark National Historical Park (including the former Fort Clatsop National Memorial), located in the vicinity of the mouth of the Columbia River, commemorates the Lewis and Clark Expedition. Administration of the park, which includes both federal and state lands, is a cooperative effort of the National Park Service and the states of Oregon and Washington. The National Historical Park was dedicated on November 12, 2004.

After reaching the Pacific Ocean, the Corps of Discovery camped at Fort Clatsop in the winter of 1805–1806. The park features a replica of the fort and a nearby visitor center. Also included in the park are several sites on the north bank of the river in Washington and other sites in Oregon.

Lewis and Clark National Historical Park
The federal park began as Fort Clatsop National Memorial which was established on May 29, 1958.  The memorial was listed on the National Register of Historic Places on October 15, 1966.  On October 30, 2004, it was redesignated Lewis and Clark National Historical Park with expanded jurisdiction over multiple sites, including:

 Fort Clatsop
 Fort to Sea Trail (dedicated on November 14, 2005)
 Netul Landing
 Salt Works
 Station Camp/Middle Village
 Clark's Dismal Nitch

Oregon State Parks

Ecola State Park
Ecola State Park was the site of the Corps of Discovery's 1806 trek over difficult terrain to see a beached whale. Today, it features several miles of hiking trails through old-growth forest and several beaches. Haystack Rock and the Needles are visible from many sites in the park.

Fort Stevens State Park
Fort Stevens, with its  park, offers exploration of history, nature, and recreational opportunities. The fort was the Oregon component of the three-fort Harbor Defense Command area at the mouth of the Columbia River (Fort Canby and Fort Columbia were the other two).

Sunset Beach State Recreation Site
Sunset Beach is the terminus of the Fort To Sea Trail, which begins in Fort Clatsop. Sunset Beach also provides visitors with direct access to the Pacific Ocean with expansive views from Cape Disappointment to the north and Tillamook Head to the south.

Washington State Parks

Cape Disappointment State Park
Cape Disappointment State Park, formerly known as Fort Canby State Park, is a  camping park on Cape Disappointment on the Long Beach Peninsula, fronted by the Pacific Ocean. The park offers  of ocean beach, two lighthouses, an interpretive center, hiking trails, and the remains of Fort Canby. The Cape Disappointment Historic District was listed on the National Register on August 15, 1975.

Fort Columbia State Park
Fort Columbia State Park preserves Fort Columbia, a coastal artillery post along the north side of the Columbia river outlet. At , the park includes an interpretive center focused on the fort and regional history.

Chinook Point, the site from which an American captain, Robert Gray, first saw the Columbia River, is part of the park. His explorations gave the United States a strong position in its later territorial contests with Great Britain. Chinook Point was named a National Historic Landmark in 1961.

See also
 Columbia Bar

Notes

References

External links

 
 
 
 
 
 
 
"Writings of Lewis and Clark", broadcast from Fort Clatsop National Memorial from C-SPAN's American Writers

Historical Parks
National Historical Parks of the United States
State parks of Oregon
State parks of Washington (state)
Parks in Clatsop County, Oregon
Parks in Pacific County, Washington
National Register of Historic Places in Clatsop County, Oregon
National Register of Historic Places in Washington (state)
Protected areas established in 1958
Protected areas established in 2004
National Park Service areas in Oregon
National Park Service areas in Washington (state)
Columbia River
National Register of Historic Places in Pacific County, Washington
Parks on the National Register of Historic Places in Oregon
Parks on the National Register of Historic Places in Washington (state)